The Piszkéstető Station or Piszkéstető Mountain Station is an astronomical observatory in Mátraszentimre in Mátra Mountains, about  northeast of Hungary's capital Budapest. It is a station of Konkoly Observatory, first built in 1958. It has the observatory code 461 and 561 for being used by the Szeged University and Konkoly Observatory, respectively.

Instruments 

The observatory features four telescopes:
 60/90/180-centimetre Schmidt telescope since 1962
 50-centimetre Cassegrain telescope since 1966
 1-metre Ritchey–Chrétien telescope since 1974
 40-centimetre Ritchey–Chrétien telescope since 2010

Discovery of 2022 EB5 

Piszkéstető Station discovered asteroid , which later impacted earth. It is only the fifth asteroid in history to have been discovered prior to impact. This puts the station in a very short list of observatories that have achieved this feat. Several asteroids impact earth every year with enough force to be detected by infrasound sensors designed to detect detonation of nuclear devices, but the vast majority of impacts are unpredicted and occur without warning. Fortunately Piszkéstető Station discovered this asteroid before it impacted.

Honors 

The minor planet 37432 Piszkéstető was named after the station, where it was discovered by astronomers Krisztián Sárneczky and Zsuzsanna Heiner in January 2002.

List of discovered minor planets 

A total of 19 minor planet discoveries are credited directly to the Piszkéstető Station by the Minor Planet Center.

Gallery

See also 
 List of asteroid-discovering observatories
 List of astronomical observatories
 
 List of observatory codes

References

External links 
 Piszkéstető Station
 3D animation: 1 m RCC telescope

Astronomical observatories in Hungary

Minor-planet discovering observatories